Ambrose is a city in Divide County, North Dakota, United States. The population was 24 at the 2020 census. Ambrose was founded in 1906.

History
Ambrose was laid out in 1906 on the Soo Railway. The city was named in honor of a railroad worker. A post office has been in operation at Ambrose since 1906.

Geography
Ambrose is located at  (48.954219, -103.482933).

Demographics

2010 census
As of the census of 2010, there were 26 people, 18 households, and 4 families residing in the city. The racial makeup of the city was 100.0% White.

There were 18 households, of which 11.1% had children under the age of 18 living with them, 11.1% were married couples living together, 5.6% had a female householder with no husband present, 5.6% had a male householder with no wife present, and 77.8% were non-families. 72.2% of all households were made up of individuals, and 16.7% had someone living alone who was 65 years of age or older. The average household size was 1.44 and the average family size was 2.25.

The median age in the city was 53.5 years. 7.7% of residents were under the age of 18; 7.6% were between the ages of 18 and 24; 19.1% were from 25 to 44; 53.8% were from 45 to 64; and 11.5% were 65 years of age or older. The gender makeup of the city was 57.7% male and 42.3% female.

2000 census
As of the census of 2000, there were 23 people, 13 households, and 5 families residing in the city. The population density was 21.6 people per square mile (8.3/km2). There were 41 housing units at an average density of 38.5 per square mile (14.8/km2). The racial makeup of the city was 100.00% White.

There were 13 households, out of which 15.4% had children under the age of 18 living with them, 23.1% were married couples living together, 15.4% had a female householder with no husband present, and 61.5% were non-families. 61.5% of all households were made up of individuals, and 7.7% had someone living alone who was 65 years of age or older. The average household size was 1.77 and the average family size was 3.00.

In the city, the population was spread out, with 21.7% under the age of 18, 4.3% from 18 to 24, 17.4% from 25 to 44, 39.1% from 45 to 64, and 17.4% who were 65 years of age or older. The median age was 46 years. For every 100 females, there were 109.1 males. For every 100 females age 18 and over, there were 157.1 males.

The median income for a household in the city was $56,250, and the median income for a family was $75,138. Males had a median income of $55,417 versus $8,750 for females. The per capita income for the city was $19,679. There were no families and 15.8% of the population living below the poverty line, including no under eighteens and 100.0% of those over 64.

Climate
This climatic region is typified by large seasonal temperature differences, with warm to hot (and often humid) summers and cold (sometimes severely cold) winters.  According to the Köppen Climate Classification system, Ambrose has a humid continental climate, abbreviated "Dfb" on climate maps.

See also
 Ambrose–Torquay Border Crossing

References

External links

 City of Ambrose official website

Cities in North Dakota
Cities in Divide County, North Dakota
Populated places established in 1906
1906 establishments in North Dakota